Limatula, the file shells or file clams, is a genus of marine bivalve molluscs in the family Limidae.

Species
 Limatula attenuata Dall, 1916 - attenuate fileclam 
 Limatula aupouria Powell, 1937  
 Limatula confusa (E. A. Smith, 1885) - confusing fileclam   
 Limatula gwyni (Sykes, 1903)    
 Limatula hendersoni Olsson and McGinty, 1958 - henderson fileclam, minute fileclam
 Limatula hodgsoni  (E. A. Smith, 1907)
 Limatula hyalina A. E. Verrill and Bush, 1898 - ahyaline fileclam, hyaline fileclam   
 Limatula hyperborea A. S. Jensen, 1909 - Arctic fileclam, boreal fileclam   
 Limatula japonica A. Adams, 1864 - Japan fileclam 
 Limatula maoria Finlay, 1927 
 Limatula regularis A. E. Verrill and Bush, 1898 - aregular fileclam, regular fileclam   
 Limatula saturna Bernard, 1978 - Saturna fileclam, saturnine fileclam   
 Limatula setifera Dall, 1886 - bristly fileclam   
 Limatula similaris (Dall, 1908) - furrowless fileclam   
 Limatula subauriculata (Montagu, 1808) - small-ear fileclam   
 Limatula subovata (Jeffreys, 1876)    
 Limatula sulcata (Brown, 1827)
 Limatula suteri Dall, 1908    
 Limatula vancouverensis Bernard, 1978 - Vancouver fileclam 
Species brought into synonymy
 Limatula pygmaea (Philippi, 1845): synonym of Limea pygmaea (Philippi, 1845)

References
 
 Powell A. W. B., New Zealand Mollusca, William Collins Publishers Ltd, Auckland, New Zealand 1979 

Limidae
Bivalve genera